These hits topped the Dutch Top 40 in 1996 (see 1996 in music).

See also
1996 in music

1996 in the Netherlands
1996 record charts
1996